The Cadet Monument is a monument at the United States Military Academy Cemetery, originally dedicated in honor of cadet Vincent M. Lowe, who died as a result of a premature cannon discharge in 1817.  The names of cadets and professors who died while at the academy during its earliest days are inscribed upon the monument. The monument is located in the far northeastern corner of the cemetery.

References

Monuments and memorials at West Point
1818 sculptures
Stone sculptures in New York (state)
1818 establishments in New York (state)
Outdoor sculptures in New York (state)